La Tapoa is a town on the Niger River in the Tillabéri Region of south-western Niger.

Transport
The town is served by La Tapoa Airport.

Populated places in Niger